Mary Holbrook (1939–2019) was a cheesemaker and curator.  She studied archaeology and worked in museums before retiring to work on her family farm in Timsbury, Somerset where she kept goats and pigs.  The goats were milked to make a variety of cheeses which were sold through gourmet outlets such as Harrods and Neal's Yard Dairy.

References

External links
 Mary Holbrook at Sleight Farm – visit by Neal's Yard Dairy

cheesemakers
British curators